Storkau may refer to the following places in Germany:

 Storkau, Stendal
 Storkau, Weißenfels